The Dick Tracy Show is an American animated television series based on Chester Gould's comic strip crime fighter. The series was produced from 1961 to 1962 by UPA.

In the show, policeman Dick Tracy employed a series of cartoony subordinate flatfoots to fight crime each week, contacting them on his two-way wristwatch radio. Tracy himself hardly appeared on the show at all. The opening was designed so that local TV hosts dressed as policemen could introduce the cartoon by barking orders into a prop intercom, with Tracy answering "Okay, chief, I'll get onto it right away."

A live action show, Dick Tracy, aired on ABC from 1950 to 1951.

Summary
Everett Sloane voiced Tracy, while Mel Blanc, Paul Frees, Benny Rubin and others voiced many of the other characters, including:

 Joe Jitsu, a parody of Charlie Chan and Mr. Moto (featuring many movie images of Chinese and Japanese culture).  He is an intelligent detective who fights with martial arts (repeatedly slamming his victim to the ground while saying "So sorry!... Excuse me, please!... Begging your pardon!"). He is named after the Japanese martial art of jujitsu. Benny Rubin provided his voice throughout the series.
 Hemlock Holmes, a loud, bumbling, Cockney police bulldog (named in honor of Sherlock Holmes and with a voice patterned after Cary Grant's) voiced by Jerry Hausner.  He is backed up by his own police squad, the Retouchables—named after the Untouchables, but looking and behaving more like the Keystone Kops.
 Heap O'Calorie, a parody of Andy Devine, voiced by "Uncle" Johnny Coons. This redheaded street cop has a serious weight problem and a penchant for stealing apples from an outdoor fruit stand.  Before setting out on an assignment, Heap would invariably get the "word on the street" from a bongo-pounding beatnik (named "Nick") who communicated solely by beating coded messages on his drums.
 Manuel Tijuana Guadalajara Tampico "Go-Go" Gomez, Jr., essentially a human version of Speedy Gonzales, another Blanc character, though Paul Frees did his voice for most of the series. Go-Go wears a big Sombrero and a big grin and is often seen lounging in a hammock while waiting for an assignment.

A gag used in several shows was that if one of Tracy's detectives found themselves in sudden danger (a bullet speeding towards them, falling off a cliff, etc.)  he would yell, "Hold everything!" The action would obediently screech to a halt and "wait", while the detective called headquarters for further instructions.  Action would resume only after the sign-off catchphrase, "Six-two and even, over and out" was spoken at the end of the call.

Villains taken from Dick Tracy creator Chester Gould's popular comic strip usually had names that served as descriptions of their physical appearance or some other peculiarity. All were paired with another villain for the cartoon series. They included  Flattop  who worked with B.B. Eyes, Pruneface and Itchy, Stooge Viller and Mumbles, The Brow and Oodles, and The Mole and Sketch Paree. Each pair of crooks had at least one member who smoked either a cigar or a cigarette on an extender. One villain created specifically for the cartoon was Cheater Gunsmoke, who appeared in two episodes. Gunsmoke was a Texas-sounding cigar smoker with a literal cloud of smoke obscuring his face and head. Of all the villains in the animated series, Stooge had made his first appearance in the comic strip earliest (1933) and Oodles latest (1955), six years before the show was aired.

Some of the villains were given voices patterned after famous actors.  Flattop sounded like Peter Lorre, B.B.Eyes like Edward G. Robinson, Pruneface like Boris Karloff, and The Brow like James Cagney.

The cartoons seldom involved the title character. The opening scene of every episode showed Tracy in his office, speaking into a two-way radio the words: "Okay, Chief! I'll get on it right away. Dick Tracy calling..." He would then hand the case over to one of his comic law-enforcement assistants, who engaged in slapstick battles with the crooks (who, compared to their comic strip counterparts, were penny ante and not as bright). Tracy showed up at the very end, usually by car or helicopter, to congratulate the assistant on a job well done and take the crooks into custody. Tracy, as Chief of Detectives, presented an image of calm professionalism in contrast to the comedic roles that the funny subordinates played.

Lesson
Tracy would play a more prominent role in some episodes that were bookended with a quick lesson on real-world crime fighting. In these, Tracy would explain to the viewer how their local police use methods such as fingerprinting or the use of composite artists to help identify suspects.

Mr. Magoo crossover
UPA was also the producer of the Mr. Magoo cartoons, and a crossover was arranged between Tracy and Magoo in a 1965 episode of the TV series The Famous Adventures of Mr. Magoo.  In this episode, "Dick Tracy and the Mob", Tracy persuades Magoo (a well-known actor in the context of the Famous Adventures series) to impersonate an international hit man whom he resembles named Squinty Eyes, and infiltrate a gang of criminals made up of Pruneface (their leader in this case), Itchy, Flattop, Mumbles, The Mole, The Brow and Oodles. Unlike the earlier animated Tracy shorts, this longer episode was played relatively straight, with Tracy getting much more screen time, and Chief Patton was part of the episode. It is notable for pitting Tracy against a coalition of most of his foes, a concept that would be adopted more than two decades later in the 1990 film. None of Tracy's assistants (Hemlock Holmes, Joe Jitsu, etc.) appeared and several villains sounded nothing like their Dick Tracy Show counterparts. For example, Howard Morris took over the roles of Flattop and Oodles, although Everett Sloane reprised his role as Tracy.

Original syndicated run
These 130 five-minute cartoons were designed and packaged for syndication much in the same way as Associated Artists Productions packaged the 231 Popeye cartoon shorts and the pre-1950 Warner Bros.' short subjects. Usually intended for morning and afternoon children's television series, a local host would introduce the cartoon as part of the show.

The cartoon show was a success perhaps as a child's version of The Untouchables that was popular at the time. Local hosts of the show offered "Dick Tracy Crimestopper" badges and certificates their viewers could send in for. Mattel toys manufactured a series of toy guns and a board game with the Dick Tracy logo and the Crimestoppers could communicate with each other by toy Dick Tracy wrist radios.

Episodes

Controversy
The Dick Tracy Show was pulled from syndication in the mid-1970s and mid-1980s, and was not seen for years afterward because of what some perceived as racist undertones and use of ethnic stereotypes and accents. 

Some Asians and Hispanics charged that characters Joe Jitsu (an Asian buck-toothed character) and Go Go Gomez (a sombrero-wearing Mexican) were offensive stereotypes. Two stations in Los Angeles removed the airings and edited episodes were then sent out while one station, KCAL Channel 9, which at the time was owned by Disney, continued to broadcast The Dick Tracy Show until July 4, 1990. Henry G. Saperstein, then the chairman of UPA, stated "It's just a cartoon, for goodness' sake."

VHS
The show was released on VHS in 1986 by Hi-Tops Video, under the name of "Dick Tracy and the Oyster Caper", then in 1989 by Paramount Home Video in thirteen volumes, each containing ten episodes and crimestopper tips by Tracy (voiced by Everette Sloane).

DVD
All episodes were released by Classic Media on a 4-disc DVD "Collector's Edition" set.

Popular culture
The UPA version of Dick Tracy was scheduled to appear as a cameo in the deleted scene "Acme's Funeral" from the film Who Framed Roger Rabbit.  Curiously Dick Tracy already appeared as a cameo in the novel Who Censored Roger Rabbit? by Gary K. Wolf. 

Joe Jitsu makes a cameo in the Drawn Together episode "Foxxy vs. the Board of Education" and is depicted as one of the Asian students who disguised to take the SAT test in place of the other students who are using them to fake their scores.

References

External links 
 

First-run syndicated television programs in the United States
1960s American animated television series
1961 American television series debuts
1962 American television series endings
American children's animated action television series
American children's animated adventure television series
American children's animated comedy television series
DreamWorks Classics franchises
UPA series and characters
Television shows based on comic strips
Dick Tracy
Animation controversies in television
Race-related controversies in animation
Race-related controversies in television